The 2019–20 Bucknell Bison men's basketball team represented Bucknell University during the 2019–20 NCAA Division I men's basketball season. The Bison, led by fifth-year head coach Nathan Davis, played their home games at Sojka Pavilion in Lewisburg, Pennsylvania as members of the Patriot League. They finished the season 14–20, 8–10 in Patriot League play to finish in a tie for sixth place. They defeated Holy Cross and American to advance to the semifinals of the Patriot League tournament where they lost to Boston University.

Previous season 
The Bison finished the 2018–19 season 21–12, 13–5 to earn a share of the regular season Patriot League championship. As the No. 2 seed in the Patriot League tournament, they defeated Holy Cross and Lehigh before losing to Colgate in the championship game. They were not selected for postseason play.

Roster

Schedule and results

|-
!colspan=9 style=| Non-conference regular season

|-
!colspan=9 style=| Patriot League regular season

|-
!colspan=9 style=| Patriot League tournament

Source

References

Bucknell Bison men's basketball seasons
Bucknell
Bucknell
Bucknell